Daniël Haringh (1636 in Loosduinen – 1713 in Loosduinen), was an 18th-century painter from the Northern Netherlands.

Biography
According to the RKD he was a pupil during the years 1664–1669 of Arnold van Ravesteyn and Caspar Netscher, and in 1669 he became a member of the Confrerie Pictura. He is known for portraits and interior decorations. His pupils were Richard van Bleeck, Michiel Godijn, Abraham van Hoogstraten, and Dirk Kindt, or Kint.

References

Daniël Haringh on Artnet

1636 births
1713 deaths
17th-century Dutch painters
18th-century Dutch painters
18th-century Dutch male artists
Dutch male painters
Artists from The Hague
Painters from The Hague